The 1980 NCAA Division I Men's Lacrosse Tournament was the 10th annual Division I NCAA Men's Lacrosse Championship tournament. Eight NCAA Division I college men's lacrosse teams met after having played their way through a regular season, and for some, a conference tournament.

Tournament overview
The championship game was hosted by Cornell University, and was played in front of 7,557 fans. The game saw the Johns Hopkins University defeat University of Virginia by the score of 9–8 in double-overtime, to win their third straight national title. Hopkins came back from an 8 to 6 deficit with nine minutes left to play, when attackman Jeff Harris took a pass from Jim Bidne in front of the Virginia goal and rifled a shot over the left shoulder of the Cavalier's goalie with 0:48 to play in the second overtime to give Hopkins the team's third straight national title. Virginia had defeated the Blue Jays earlier in the year 12 to 9 ending Hopkins 25 game win streak.

Following the tournament, National lacrosse champ Johns Hopkins dominated the Division I All American squad with eight total selections. Goalie Mike Federico, defenseman Mark Greenberg and midfielder Brendan Schneck repeated as first team choices, while Jeff Cook made the second team attack squad.

Virginia was notable in this tournament for playing overtime games in all three of their contests, including the two overtime game against Hopkins in the finals.  Hopkins players Wayne Davis and Ned Radebaugh were both sidelined. Virginia took advantage at the face off with Cavs junior Steve Kraus winning 17 of his 20 faceoffs. The title winning goal by Jeff Harris in the second overtime period won Hopkins the first-ever third straight NCAA title, a feat which would not be duplicated for 10 more years.

Tournament results

(i) one overtime
(ii) two overtimes

Tournament boxscores

Tournament Finals

Tournament Semi-Finals

Tournament Quarterfinals

Tournament outstanding players

 Jim Bidne, Attack, Johns Hopkins, tournament Most Outstanding Player

References

External links 
1980 Title Game on YouTube
Johns Hopkins Wins Lacrosse Title Eugene Register-Guard - Jun 1, 1980

NCAA Division I Men's Lacrosse Championship
NCAA Division I Men's Lacrosse Championship
NCAA Division I Men's Lacrosse Championship
NCAA Division I Men's Lacrosse Championship
NCAA Division I Men's Lacrosse Championship